Macksburg Lutheran Church is a historic Lutheran church located in Canby, Oregon, United States. The church was built between 1892 and 1894, in order to serve the needs of German-speaking immigrants from Germany and Austria. Historically, the church offered sermons and Sunday school in both the German and English languages, on an alternating basis.

Macksburg Lutheran Church was listed on the National Register of Historic Places on June 14, 1982.

References

External links
 Macksburg Lutheran Church (Canby, Oregon), University of Oregon Libraries

Austrian-American history
Carpenter Gothic church buildings in Oregon
German-American history
German-American culture in Oregon
Lutheran churches in Oregon
Churches on the National Register of Historic Places in Oregon
Churches completed in 1894
Canby, Oregon
National Register of Historic Places in Clackamas County, Oregon
1894 establishments in Oregon